The 2022 Fótbolti.net Cup was the 12th season of Iceland's annual pre-season tournament. The tournament involves eight clubs from the top two leagues in Iceland, Úrvalsdeild karla and 1. deild karla, and uses a combination of group and knockout rounds to determine each team's final position in the competition.

Fotbolti.net Cup A

Group A

Group B

Fotbolti.net Cup B

Group A

Group B

Fotbolti.net Cup C

Group A

Group B

References

Fotbolti